Lynne Murray, FBA is a British psychopathologist and academic, specialising in child development. She is Professor of Developmental Psychology at the University of Reading. She has authored The Social Baby (2000) and The Psychology of Babies (2014), in addition to more than 200 academic papers.

Honours
In July 2017, Murray was elected a Fellow of the British Academy (FBA), the United Kingdom's national academy for the humanities and social sciences.

Selected works

References

Living people
Psychopathologists
British psychologists
British women psychologists
Developmental psychologists
Fellows of the British Academy
Academics of the University of Reading
Year of birth missing (living people)